The Wurmaulspitze is a mountain in the Zillertal Alps in South Tyrol, Italy.

References 
 Hanspaul Menara: Südtiroler Gipfelwanderungen; Athesia; Bozen 2001, 
 Dieter Seibert: Leichte 3000er, Bruckmann Verlag, München 2001,

External links 

Mountains of the Alps
Mountains of South Tyrol
Alpine three-thousanders
Zillertal Alps